Geng: The Adventure Begins (originally Geng: Misteri Hantu Durian) is a 2009 Malaysian 3D computer animated film. The film is produced by Les' Copaque and released in Malaysian cinemas beginning 12 February 2009. Geng was launched in a ceremony held on 11 September 2007 together with short animated series Upin & Ipin that have connections with the film. Planning for the film began in late-2005 as Les Copaque commenced operations. It received financial support from ICT-related agencies such as Multimedia Development Corporation and MIMOS.

Plot

The movie begins with Badrol and Lim watching the news covering about the sudden disappearance of durians in Badrol's home village, Kampung Durian Runtuh. A news reporter interviews Badrol's grandfather Tok Dalang about the previous night (a durian fell but something managed to eat it and leave the durians shell clean). Tok Dalang and the locals dub the "something" a durian ghost since its unknown of who or what is eating the durians late at night. Badrol gets skeptical and decides to go to the village, taking Lim along with him. 

After riding on a bus which gets its tire punctured, the two are forced to walk to the village which is 5 km away. After a few complains from Lim, a truck driver named Mr. Singh noticed the two and decided to give them a ride much to his friend and boss Pak Mail's chagrin. Badrol then tells them about their journey with Pak Mail talking about an abandoned house.

At the village Upin and Ipin are playing in, Uncle Muthu's outdoor restaurant while Sally is impatiently waiting for his pastries, Mak Uda, called Opah by Upin and Ipin's as she is their grandmother, arrives. The twins greet Opah who tells them to come home with their older sister Kak Ros, Opah then asks Sally to see if he has finished making her clothing and ushers to fix it as Sally tells Opah that he couldn't finish sewing the clothes simply because the buttons keep popping out and is ruining his nails. After Sally complains about Opah, Opah then asks Ah Tong about the news of the durian ghost, but Ah Tong claims the durian ghost to be unreal, Opah claims Ah Tong that he 'never believes in anything'. Sally leaves as he lost his appetite as Singh and Pak Mail drops Badrol and Lim on the shop the two then decided to ask Muthu for directions to Tok Dalang's house since Badrol hasn't been in the village for a while and he doesn't remember the way to his house but due to Muthu's unclear directions, he decided to ask Upin and Ipin to lead Badrol and Lim instead while Kak Ros drops by to deliver the pastries but decided to follow her brothers as she is forced by Uncle Muthu. 

Upon arriving at Tok Dalang's (called by Atok) house and having a reunion, Badrol and Lim took Atok's suggestions which is to explore the village, Badrol and Lim then have a motorcycle race, knocking out a child named Rajoo, who forces the two to replace his radio (when Rajoo sees the two heading towards him he jumped into the water with the radio) and his one-horned cow Sapy into the water. Badrol and Lim are telling him that they going home to Tok Dalang's house.

At night, Tok Dalang talks about the Durian Ghost, and Badrol and Lim sleep, with Lim wanting to go to the bathroom. The next day, they go to Tok Dalang's durian orchard with Rajoo's wagon, with an impromptu musical number ensuing. After Upin, Ipin and Rajoo ride a leaf, they find a fox-like creature named Oopet. Kak Ros, Badrol and Lim find them and at night, they go camping. A monster then chases them and they go to the cave, where they get chased by a snake monster and attacked by large leeches. Tok Dalang, Opah, Muthu and Ah Tong then go to the orchard to find them. Oopet is then revealed to have been eating the durians. Oopet tells Rajoo to find his mother. Badrol and Lim get kidnapped by Uncle Singh (revealed to be disguised as the monster) to the cabin. Rajoo then sneaks to the cabin that Uncle Singh and Pak Mail have some plans for haunting the orchard. They manage to save Badrol and Lim and escape the cabin. Oopet tries to help his mother but Pak Mail catches him, with his mother then attacking Pak Mail and Uncle Singh for wanting to kidnap her son. They escaped, but his mother is chasing them. They go to the cave again and Oopet tells them to run while Oopet's mother is fighting the snake monster.

They say farewell to Oopet, and Tok Dalang, Opah, and Muthu find Upin, Ipin, Badrol, Lim and Rajoo, with them the accusing Abang Salleh of following Mr. Singh's and Pak Mail's plans. Lim hands Rajoo his CD player and calls him, along with Upin, Ipin, Badrol and Kak Ros part of a "gang". In a mid-credits scene, we see Pak Mail and Mr. Singh roaming in Oopet's world, with them getting chased by Oopet's mother.

Production
It took two years, RM 4.7 million and 40 local animators to complete Geng, which director Mohd Nizam Abdul Razak compares as cheap against Western animation budgets worth "around RM15 million to RM40 million" and "about 130 to 150 animators". Les'Copaque Production's managing director, Burhanuddin Md Radzi, told that planning the film began when Mohd Nizam, Muhammad Usamah Zaid and Mohd Safwan Ab Karim met him to read out their plan. In terms of cost-saving, he said that the computers were bought from Low Yat Plaza with modifications of their own, besides financial and logistic support from MDeC, MIMOS Bhd and MOSTI". Maya and MentalRay were employed as the main 3D animation software. Nizam added that supply from Mimos worth millions of ringgit allowed Les' Copaque to perform rendering in only six to eight months compared to the usual over-one-year period, as well as saving costs. Geng was completed in August 2008 at 108 minutes, and was previewed to invited guests from MDeC, Finas, Mimos, RTM, Media Prima, Astro and the press. It had been shortened to 90 minutes on the advice of Finas to please the cinema operators. Les' Copaque was also busy completing the Upin & Ipin shorts for television which somewhat disrupted post-production of Geng. Les' Copaque prepared five original Geng reels, three of which were sent to Kantana Group in Bangkok, Thailand for audio mixing. In November 2008, Les' Copaque announced the Censorship Board's approval of their film without cuts and permission to screen by Finas. The music for Geng is mainly composed by Yuri Wong, who also composed music for the related animated series Upin & Ipin, along with Mohamed Azfaren Aznam, who contributed music as a second composer.

Reception
Les' Copaque has been reported to place targets ranging from RM5 million to RM10 million, and even RM100 million after considering international distribution plans. Geng opened on 12 August 2011 to incredible public response and rave reviews. On its first week in Malaysian cinemas, it gained RM2.3 million at the box office. As of 1 April, it was confirmed that Geng had amassed RM 6,314,526 of ticket sales throughout its seven weeks on Malaysian silver screens, in a rare event in which a Malaysian film has single-handedly defeated an array of major foreign releases, which at that time included Oscar nominees Slumdog Millionaire and The Curious Case of Benjamin Button.

Box office chronology

Awards
2009
 International Film Festival for Children, Indonesia
Anugerah Pilihan Penonton (People's Choice Awards)
 22nd Malaysian Film Festival
2 Jury's Choice Awards (box office, animated feature film with distinctive characters)
 MSC Malaysia Kre8tif! Industry Awards
Best Editor (Mohd Faiz Hanafiah)
Best Music/Score (Yuri Wong)

References

External links
 
 
Production blog of Geng: The Adventure Begins

2009 films
Malay-language films
Malaysian comedy films
2009 horror films
2000s comedy horror films
Films set in 2008
Malaysian animated films
2009 computer-animated films
Les' Copaque Production films
Grand Brilliance films
2009 comedy films